Dalderby is a village in the East Lindsey district of Lincolnshire, England.

Dalderby once had an Anglican parish church dedicated to Saint Martin. It was demolished in 1742, possibly because of a decline in village population.

Teapot Hall was an early 19th-century one-roomed cottage with a thatched roof. However it was long regarded as a medieval building, of considerable historical importance as a survival of an early timber-framed house.  In 1945 it was burnt down accidentally during VJ Day celebrations, and nothing remains today.  It was at this point that its true date was discovered.

Manor Farmhouse is a Grade II listed building that dates from the 17th century. It has a thatched roof. Dado paneling inside the building reputedly was taken from the demolished St. Martin's Church.

Supposedly the village sent the largest proportion of its men to fight in World War I of any village in the country. A "War Cross", or temporary stand-in for a permanent war memorial, was unveiled there by General Sir William Robertson, chief of the Imperial General Staff from 1916 to 1918.

References

External links

Villages in Lincolnshire
East Lindsey District